BFC Daugavpils is a Latvian football club that is based in Daugavpils. They play in the Latvian Higher League. The club plays its home matches at the Celtnieks Stadium in Daugavpils with a capacity of 3,980 people.

History

Domestic history

Squad

Honours
Latvian First League (1) 2013

References

External links
Official website 

 
Sport in Daugavpils
Football clubs in Latvia
Association football clubs established in 2009
2009 establishments in Latvia